Gyeongbokgung station is a subway station on Line 3 of the Seoul Metropolitan Subway. It is the subway station nearest to the Gyeongbokgung Palace. The station is also near the Government Complex–Seoul, the National Police Agency of South Korea, and other administrative buildings in the neighborhood.

Station layout

Vicinity
Exit 1: Sajik Park
Exit 2: Hyoja-dong
Exit 3: Chinese Embassy of Korea
Exit 4: Cheongwadae
Exit 5: Gyeongbok Palace, Gwanghwamun
Exit 6: Government Complex-Seoul, Gwanghwamun Station
Exit 7: Seoul Metropolitan Police Agency

Tourism
The station displays artifacts from various dynasties, with walls decorated in ornate displays design to appeal to tourists.

In January 2013, the Seoul Metropolitan Rapid Transit Corporation, which operates this line, published free guidebooks in three languages: English, Japanese and Chinese (simplified and traditional), which features eight tours as well as recommendations for accommodations, restaurants and shopping centers. The tours are designed with different themes, e.g. Korean traditional culture, which goes from Jongno 3-ga Station to Anguk Station and this station on line No 3 that showcases antique shops and art galleries of Insa-dong.

References

Metro stations in Jongno District
Seoul Metropolitan Subway stations
Seoul Subway Line 3
Railway stations in South Korea opened in 1985